Fred Richard Mast (December 8, 1896 – October 31, 1986) was an American politician in the state of Washington. He served in the Washington House of Representatives from 1953 to 1967 for district 35.

References

1986 deaths
1896 births
Republican Party members of the Washington House of Representatives
20th-century American politicians